Frías de Albarracín is a municipality in the province of Teruel, Sierra de Albarracín Comarca, Aragon, Spain. The town is located in the Montes Universales area, Sistema Ibérico.  According to the 2013 census (INE), the municipality has a population of 143 inhabitants.

The source of the Tagus is the Fuente de García, located within the Frías de Albarracín municipal term at almost 1600 m above sea level.

See also 
 Montes Universales

References

External links

 Pictures of Frias town

Municipalities in the Province of Teruel